Champ de Mars: A Story of War is the English-language translation of Pierre-Michel Tremblay's Au Champ de Mars, a play set in Montreal that deals with war's effect on soldiers and civilians alike. The play was first produced by Théâtre de la Manufacture in 2009. An English language translation was made by Paula Wing

Characters

 A figment of Eric's imagination, he taunts and torments Eric about a mysterious incident which has left the young soldier damaged.
 A pacifist who has strong ideals which are not matched by strong actions. He is also an electronic musician who teaches klezmer clarinet lessons.
 A young soldier who has been traumatized by his time in Afghanistan. He is estranged from his family and friends, and feels intense guilt about something that happened while he was in active duty.
 A psychologist who works with young war veterans struggling with post-traumatic stress disorder. She, herself, suffers from compassion fatigue, and seeks solace in Klezmer clarinet lessons.
 An action film maker who hopes to direct a masterpiece, an Apocalypse Now for this generation. He hopes to use Scott as inspiration.

The title of the play refers to the ancient Roman Campus Martius, or Field of Mars, which was traditionally a training ground for battle. It also refers to the park in Montreal called Champ de Mars Park.

References

External links 
  Théâtre de la manufacture - Au Champ de Mars, de Pierre-Michel Tremblay, Yves Rousseau - Le Quatrième, 2010
  Choc post-traumatique, Phillipe Couture - Voir, 2010
  AU CHAMP DE MARS : ÇA FRAPPE FORT!, Cynthia Lemieux - La Metropole, 2010
  Arts in Autumn, Theatre: Canadian originals, timeless classics to hit stage, Pat Donnelly - Montreal Gazette, 2010
  THEATRE: Fallin' on stage, Neil Boyce - Montreal Mirror, 2010
  The curtain calls, MJ Stone - The Hour, 2010

Quebec plays
Plays about war
Plays set in Montreal
2009 plays
French-language plays